Daniela Solera Vega (born 21 July 1997) is a Costa Rican international footballer who plays as a goalkeeper for the Costa Rica women's national football team. She appeared in three matches for Costa Rica at the 2018 CONCACAF Women's Championship.

References

1997 births
Living people
Costa Rican women's footballers
Costa Rica women's international footballers
Costa Rican expatriate sportspeople in Spain
Expatriate women's footballers in Spain
Women's association football goalkeepers